(1908–1971) was a francophone daily newspaper published by  in Casablanca, Morocco. It became one of the most important French publications in the period of the French Protectorate.

History 
Following the bombardment and military invasion and occupation of Casablanca in 1907, a French daily called  was established by a reporter for the Parisian newspaper Le Matin on November 28, 1908, at the behest of General Albert d'Amade, "for the defense of the interests of and the extension of the influence of France". With a conservative, colonial editorial line that rejected any notion of Moroccan sovereignty and supported the idea of making Morocco an extension of French Algeria. In 1912 in its 682nd issue, the newspaper published:""
"To hell with the political essays, the international apprehensions, and the endorsements of regimes. Among those who have not yet ratified the establishment of the protectorate, Morocco should be considered French. This coming 14th of July will be the first when you will be able to, boldly and meaningfully, hoist our tricolor flag over the Moroccan city."

Presse Mas 
Pierre Mas, founder of the  media empire, came to control  through share ownership in 1921. In 1945, Pierre Mas was censured for his newspapers' support for the Vichy regime.

"Zbib et Barnabé" 
 published a comic strip by Henri Bruneau entitled "Zbib et Barnabé," which was supposed to celebrate French-Moroccan "companionship." The character Barnabé was white and French; Zbib was a Moroccan of the south depicted in pickaninny caricature, often using vernacular Moroccan Arabic and incorrect French.

References 

Defunct newspapers published in Morocco
French-language newspapers published in Morocco
Publications established in 1908
Publications disestablished in 1971